Which Is Witch is a Looney Tunes cartoon released by Warner Bros. in 1949, directed by Friz Freleng and written by Tedd Pierce. The cartoon was released on December 3, 1949, and features Bugs Bunny.

Plot
Bugs Bunny is exploring Dark Africa. A short witch doctor ("Dr. I.C. Spots") wants to use him as a key ingredient in a prescription. Initially believing he is enjoying a hot bath, Bugs notices that he's being cooked and escapes, while Dr. Spots chases him. Bugs disguises himself as a Zulu native woman, but this ploy fails.

In the river, Bugs finds and swims to a ferry boat. As Dr. Spots follows, a crocodile eats him. Although the witch doctor is his enemy, Bugs demands that the croc "cough him up" and, when refused, wrestles the croc, finally emerging from the water with a crocodile skin handbag (Bugs having implicitly killed the animal and converted it to this form), from which Spots emerges, clad in crocodile skin attire. "Very becoming, short stuff!", Bugs nods, before making a face. "Gives you that, uh, New Look!"

Analysis 
The film includes racist images of Africans. Among the stereotypes used was the depiction of a cannibal with a giant lip plug. A record is depicted in place of the plug. Warner Bros' use of these racist stereotypes ended in the late 1940s; this is the last Bugs Bunny cartoon to include caricatures of Black people. Like most other similar cartoons involving such race-related stereotypical scenes it's rarely broadcast on television today.

Reception
The Film Daily reviewed the film on January 1, 1950: "When Dr. Ugh, Witch Doctor extraordinary for a tribe of little people, decides it's time to leave. The jungle medico learns he can't split the hare, and B.B. emerges victorious once more. Wonderful cartoon."

References

External links

 

1949 films
1949 short films
1949 animated films
1940s Warner Bros. animated short films
Looney Tunes shorts
Short films directed by Friz Freleng
Bugs Bunny films
Animated films about crocodilians
Films set in Africa
Film controversies
Race-related controversies in animation
Race-related controversies in film
1940s English-language films
Films about witch doctors